Acacia inamabilis is a shrub belonging to the genus Acacia and the subgenus Phyllodineae that is native to Western Australia.

Description
The patent to ascending, pungent, rigid, thick, green phyllodes are straight or shallowly curved. It produces yellow flowers from August to September.

Taxonomy
The species was first formally described in 1904 by the botanist Ernst Georg Pritzel as part of the work between Pritzel and Ludwig Diels Fragmenta Phytographiae Australiae occidentalis. Beitrage zur Kenntnis der Pflanzen Westaustraliens, ihrer Verbreitung und ihrer Lebensverhaltnisse as published in Botanische Jahrbücher für Systematik, Pflanzengeschichte und Pflanzengeographie. It was reclassified as Racosperma inamabile in 2003 by Leslie Pedley then transferred back to the genus Acacia in 2006.

A. inamabilis is closely related to Acacia concolorans, but is sometimes mistaken for Acacia calcarata.

Distribution
It has a scattered distribution in the Goldfields-Esperance region of Western Australia from around Mount Malcolm in the Fraser Range in the east past Norseman in the west and to the south around Peak Charles National Park. It is often found around granite boulders and outcrops and salt lakes growing in sandy and loamy soils usually as a part of open Eucalyptus woodland or mallee communities.

See also
List of Acacia species

References

inamabilis
Acacias of Western Australia
Taxa named by Ernst Pritzel
Plants described in 1904